Koldo Gil Pérez (born 16 January 1978 in Burlata, Navarra) is a former Spanish professional road racing cyclist who last rode for the UCI Continental team Liberty Seguros Continental.  His career highlights include winning a stage of the Giro d'Italia and leading the overall classification at the Tour de Suisse.

At the 2006 Tour de Suisse, Gil took stage 6 and held the leader's yellow jersey until the final stage when he was overtaken by 2004 winner Jan Ullrich in the final stage's individual time trial.  He finished a disappointing second.

After Gil was unable to find a team for the 2009 season, he announced his retirement.

Major achievements 

2000
 1st Stage 4 Vuelta a Navarra
2002
 8th Overall Route du Sud
 9th Overall Vuelta a La Rioja
1st Stage 3
 9th Clásica a los Puertos de Guadarrama
2003
 3rd Overall Volta a Catalunya
1st Stage 1 (TTT)
2004
 1st  Overall Vuelta a Castilla y León
 4th Overall Euskal Bizikleta
 4th Overall Vuelta a Aragón
 5th Trofeo Manacor
 6th Overall Setmana Catalana de Ciclisme
 8th Overall Vuelta a la Comunidad Valenciana
 8th Klasika Primavera
 9th Overall Tour of the Basque Country
2005
 1st  Overall Vuelta a Murcia
1st  Mountains classification
 1st Stage 7 Giro d'Italia
 5th Overall Setmana Catalana de Ciclisme
 6th Overall Tour de Suisse
2006
 1st  Overall Euskal Bizikleta
1st Stages 1 & 4b
 2nd Overall Tour de Suisse
1st Stage 6
 3rd GP Llodio
 8th La Flèche Wallonne
2007
 1st  Overall Vuelta Asturias
 1st Subida al Naranco
 2nd Overall Vuelta a Castilla y León
 4th Overall Vuelta a Murcia
 10th Overall Tour of the Basque Country
2008
 2nd Subida al Naranco
 4th Overall Vuelta a Asturias
 5th Overall Volta a Portugal
 5th Overall GP Internacional Paredes Rota dos Móveis
 10th Overall Troféu Joaquim Agostinho
1st Stage 3
 10th GP Llodio

Grand Tour general classification results timeline

References

External links

1978 births
Living people
Spanish male cyclists
Spanish Giro d'Italia stage winners
Tour de Suisse stage winners
People from Cuenca de Pamplona
Cyclists from Navarre